WWB may refer to:

Organizations
Women Without Borders, an international non-profit female empowerment organization founded by Edit Schlaffer in 2001.
Women's World Banking, nonprofit organisation supporting microfinance institution with a focus on women entrepreneurs
WWB Colombia, a microfinance institution in Colombia
Friends of Women's World Banking, organisation in India
Writers' War Board, American WWII propaganda organisation

Meteorology
Westerly wind burst, equatorial Pacific weather phenomenon associated with El Niño

Magazines
Words Without Borders, international literary magazine published in New York City

Bridges
Woodrow Wilson Bridge, a bridge over the Potomac River
Woodrow Wilson Bridge (Jackson, Mississippi), a bridge over the Pearl River in Mississippi

Computing
Writer's Workbench, a UNIX software package
WinWrap Basic, a Visual Basic macro language by Polar Engineering
A file extension for WordPerfect on Microsoft Windows, see List of filename extensions (S–Z) § W

Linguistics
ISO 639 code for the Wakabunga language

Music
Wild Willy Barrett, English musician

Television
Walking with Beasts

Other
"Walking while black", a spin on the phrase driving while black

See also
All pages beginning with WWB